The 2014 Asian Fencing Championships were held in Suwon, South Korea from 2 to 7 July 2014 at the Suwon Gymnasium.

Medal summary

Men

Women

Medal table

References

Results

Asian Championship
Asian Fencing Championships
Asian Fencing Championships
Asian Fencing Championships
International fencing competitions hosted by South Korea